Yusnel Bacallao Alonso (born 21 June 1988) is a Cuban chess player who received the FIDE title of Grandmaster (GM) in September 2012.

Chess career
He played in the Chess World Cup 2017, where he was defeated in the first round by Vladimir Fedoseev.

Alonso is ranked 2nd best chess player in Cuba. (May 2020)

References

External links 
 
 
 

1988 births
Living people
Cuban chess players
Chess grandmasters
Chess Olympiad competitors
People from Havana
21st-century Cuban people